Angianthula is a genus of cnidarians belonging to the family Botrucnidiferidae.

The species of this genus are found in Western Africa.

Species:

Angianthula bargmannae 
Angianthula cerfontaini

References

Botrucnidiferidae
Anthozoa genera